Stop Population Growth Now is a registered political party in South Australia led by Bob Couch. The party contested the 2014 state election in the Legislative Assembly (upper house) with a 0.4 percent vote.

In the 2018 State Election, the party ran in both the upper house and the House of Assembly (lower house) in the seat of Unley. The party gained precisely 1.2% in both electorates.

Electoral results

References

External links
Stop Population Growth Now website

See also
List of political parties in Australia

Population concern political parties
Political parties in South Australia
Single-issue political parties